This list of Australian universities by annual revenue contains the public universities in Australia with revenue in Australian dollars.

See also
Group of Eight (Australian universities)
List of universities in Australia

References

Revenue
Universities by annual revenue
Australia, Universities